Pontypool United Rugby Football Club are a Welsh rugby union club based in Pontypool South Wales. The club is a member of the Welsh Rugby Union and is a feeder club for the Dragons regional team, currently playing in the Welsh Rugby Union Division 1 East and Challenge Cup.

Pontypool United are a separate team from Pontypool RFC who play in the Welsh Championship, but the two clubs are classed as neighboring clubs within Pontypool town.  Pontypool United have been known to develop future Pontypool RFC players through the clubs Colts, Youth and Senior squads.

Notable past players
See also :Category:Pontypool United RFC players
 Graham Price
 Lloyd Burns
 Ashley Sweet

References

Welsh rugby union teams
Pontypool